Gregory Stanley Kabat (May 21, 1911 – January 12, 1994) was an American gridiron football player and coach. He played Canadian football professionally as a running back for eight seasons with the Winnipeg Blue Bombers of the Canadian Football League (NFL). He helped the Blue Bombers to two Grey Cup championships in 1935 and 1939. He played college football for the University of Wisconsin, where he was named to the 1932 College Football All-America Team as a guard. Kabat later coached football at Vancouver College, the University of British Columbia, and  Cantwell High School in Montebello, California. He was inducted into the Canadian Football Hall of Fame in 1966.

Coaching career
In 1948, Kabat was hired at the head football and head track coach at  Cantwell High School in Montebello, California. He resigned as football and track coach in 1966, but remained a member of the teaching faculty at the school.

References

External links
 University of Wisconsin Sports Hall of Fame profile
 

1911 births
1994 deaths
American players of Canadian football
American football guards
UBC Thunderbirds football coaches
Winnipeg Blue Bombers coaches
Winnipeg Blue Bombers players
Wisconsin Badgers football players
High school football coaches in California
High school track and field coaches in the United States
Canadian Football Hall of Fame inductees
Coaches of American football from Wisconsin
Players of American football from Wisconsin